WSTH-FM (106.1 FM) is a radio station broadcasting a country music format. Licensed to Alexander City, Alabama, United States, the station is owned by iHeartMedia, Inc. (as iHM Licenses) and features programming from Premiere Networks.

The station began in 1988 as "South 106".  It was then re-branded into a short-lived incarnation of "Kix 106" before becoming "Rooster 106" in 2000.  In February 2010, the station assumed a new moniker of "South 106.1".

References

External links
WSTH official website

STH-FM
Country radio stations in the United States
Radio stations established in 1988
IHeartMedia radio stations